is a Japanese hurdler who specialises in the 400 metres hurdles. He competed at the 2009 World Championships reaching the semifinals.

Personal best

International competition

References

External links

Kazuaki Yoshida at JAAF 
Kazuaki Yoshida at TBS  (archived)

1987 births
Living people
Japanese male hurdlers
Sportspeople from Hyōgo Prefecture
World Athletics Championships athletes for Japan
Universiade medalists in athletics (track and field)
Universiade silver medalists for Japan
Universiade bronze medalists for Japan
Medalists at the 2009 Summer Universiade